Goobarragandra River, a perennial stream that is part of the Murrumbidgee catchment within the Murray–Darling basin, is located in the Snowy Mountains region of New South Wales, Australia. In the past, it was also known as Tumut Little River.

Course and features

There are large waterfalls and rapids along this river. There are "camping" spots along the Goobarragandra River as well.

See also

 List of rivers of New South Wales (A–K)
 List of rivers of Australia
 Rivers of New South Wales

References

External links
 

Rivers of New South Wales
Murray-Darling basin
Snowy Mountains
Snowy Valleys Council